Josh or Joshua Williams may refer to:

Sports
 Josh Williams (American football) (born 1976), former American football player, NFL defensive tackle
 Josh Williams (Australian footballer) (born 1998), Australian rules football player for North Melbourne
 Josh Williams (English footballer) (born 2002), English association football player
 Josh Williams (soccer) (born 1988), American soccer player
 Josh Williams (racing driver) (born 1993), American professional stock car racing driver
 Joshua Williams (boxer) (born 1941), Ghanaian boxer
 Joshua Williams (cornerback) (born 1999), American football player, NFL cornerback

Other
 Josh Williams (Gowalla), American Internet entrepreneur, founder and former CEO of Gowalla
 Joshua Williams (legal writer) (1813–1881), English barrister and legal author in the field of property law
 Joshua Williams (1837–1915), New Zealand lawyer, politician, Supreme Court judge and university chancellor

See also
 Joss Williams, special effects supervisor